Kameyama Hachimangū (亀山八幡宮, Kameyama Hachimangū) is a Shinto shrine located in Shimonoseki, Yamaguchi Prefecture, Japan. It is a Hachiman shrine, dedicated to the kami Hachiman. The kami enshrined there include Emperor Ōjin, Empress Jingū, and Emperor Chūai. It was established in 859, and has an annual festival on October 15.

The shrine can be reached by bus from Shimonoseki Station.

See also 

List of Shinto shrines in Japan
Hachiman shrine

External links 
Official website

Hachiman shrines
Shinto shrines in Yamaguchi Prefecture
Beppyo shrines